Ray Lucev (born 11 January 1942) is a former  Australian rules footballer who played with South Melbourne in the Victorian Football League (VFL).

Notes

External links 

Living people
1942 births
Australian rules footballers from Western Australia
Sydney Swans players
West Perth Football Club players